Aiden James Flowers (born December 13, 2004) is an American actor. He is best known for portraying a young Klaus Mikaelson in the CW network series The Originals. He also appeared in the films The Big Short, Miss Peregrine's Home for Peculiar Children, and Nate Parker's The Birth of a Nation.

Early life 
Flowers was born on December 13, 2004 in Gulfport, Mississippi, the son of Anthony Flowers, a software migration specialist, and Mandye Self Flowers, a hospital administrator. He has younger twin sisters, Camden and Carsen Flowers, born May 26, 2006. When Flowers was asked what he wanted to be, without hesitation, he always responded, "I want to be an actor." Flowers moved with his parents and twin sisters from Gulfport, MS to Brandon, MS in 2006. He and his sisters were discovered by a New Orleans talent agent at a Jackson, MS, talent showcase in 2011.

Career 
In August 2012, Flowers officially began acting when he was cast in the supporting role of Peter Pinkerton in the musical adaptation of Victoria Kann's, Pinkalicious, a role for which he would later win, "Best Supporting Youth Actor," for the 2012 Actor's Playhouse season. In November 2012, he was asked to audition at New Stage Theatre, the only Actor's Equity theater in Jackson, MS, for their Christmas production, and was cast as the lead role of Buddy in Truman Capote's, A Christmas Memory, which ran November 29 - December 16 of 2012. Next, Flowers went on to the role of Billy in Stanley Yung's film, 2 Bedroom 1 Bath, before taking on the supporting role of Andrew Champagne in Anthony Burns' dark comedy, Home Sweet Hell, where he played the son of lead characters, Mona and Don Champagne, played by Katherine Heigl and Patrick Wilson. Flowers was featured in John Schneider's, Smothered, where he acted alongside Horror legends, R.A. Mihailoff, Bill Moseley and Kane Hodder. In October 2013, he began filming, Maggie, where he played a supporting role as the brother of Abigail Breslin, (real life sister) Carsen Flowers, and the son of Arnold Schwarzenegger. Flowers was also turned into an animated character as the face of HollywoodSouth.com, in 2013, a first for the young actor.

In 2014, Flowers was chosen for the recurring role of Young Klaus Mikaelson, in the CW network television drama, The Originals, a spin-off series of the show, The Vampire Diariess. Klaus Mikaelson, the lead character, first appeared in Season 2 of The Vampire Diaries and quickly became a fan-favorite. Flowers first appeared in episode 1.16, Farewell to Storeyville, where he helped define Klaus's back story. His portrayal of Young Klaus has been heavily lauded by both cast and fans, alike, and he is regularly invited to fan events in Georgia and throughout the Southeast. Joseph Morgan, who portrays Klaus as an adult, said in interviews that it was a relief to be able to share some of the burden of defining the character of Klaus Mikaelson with such a skilled young performer. Flowers recurs as Young Klaus in flashbacks throughout the series.

Next, Flowers filmed Race to Win, which he shared the lead alongside fellow Originals' actor, Danielle Campbell. In Race to Win, Flowers and Campbell are siblings forced to face a tough decision after a family tragedy. Flowers also made his national commercial debut in 2015 as the "ping pong kid" who beat Peyton Manning in a Nationwide Mutual Insurance commercial.  Flowers filmed supporting roles in the Darren Lynn Bousman horror movie, Abattoir, and in the film, Mind Puppets, during this time. In April 2015, he was chosen to play 10-year-old Jacob Portman in Tim Burton's adaptation of Miss Peregrine's Home for Peculiar Children. Aiden dyed his hair black and wore blue contacts to match Asa Butterfiled, who played the lead role of Jacob Portman in the film. In between filming scenes for Miss Peregrine's, he was chosen to play the younger version of Christian Bale's character, Michael Burry, in The Big Short. Flowers also traveled to Savannah, GA to film a supporting role in Nate Parker's The Birth of a Nation during this time. In 2016, Flowers will star as Bobby Joe Potrillo in the film, Craftique, a comedy based on the world of DIY crafting fairs, and will share the lead with Kennedy Brice, in the film, Castle in the Woods.

Personal life 
In his down-time Flowers enjoys participating in the award-winning Brio show choir and his church youth group. He also enjoys hiking, singing, dancing, playing piano, writing songs, creating his own stop-motion Lego movies, and watching professional wrestling. His favorite color is blue and the actor he'd most like to work with is Sylvester Stallone.

Filmography

Film

Television

References 

2004 births
Living people
People from Gulfport, Mississippi
American male actors